Tlephusa is a genus of flies in the family Tachinidae.

Species
T. cincinna Rondani, 1859
T. aurifrons Robineau-Desvoidy, 1863

References

Diptera of Europe
Diptera of Asia
Exoristinae
Tachinidae genera
Taxa named by Jean-Baptiste Robineau-Desvoidy